The Builders of the Adytum (BOTA, also spelled B.O.T.A., BotA, or B.o.t.A.) is a school of the Western mystery tradition based in Los Angeles which is registered as a non-profit tax-exempt religious organization. It was founded by Paul Foster Case and has its roots in both the Hermetic Order of the Golden Dawn and the Masonic blue lodge system. It was later extended by Ann Davies.

The B.O.T.A. teaches by correspondence, covering esoteric psychology, occult tarot, Hermetic Qabalah, astrology, and meditation techniques. It also holds a variety of ritual services and study groups, some open to the public.

Worldwide membership is around 5,000.

Origins of the name
“Adytum” is Latin for “Inner Shrine” or “Holy of Holies” and “Builders” refer to the emulation of the Carpenter from Nazareth, Jesus, who some members of the B.O.T.A. believe was adept in the mysteries of building a living temple without hands.

History
The Order was founded 1922 by Paul Foster Case. Case was a senior member of the Hermetic Order of the Golden Dawn in the United States. After a disagreement with Moina Mathers, head of the Golden Dawn and widow of MacGregor Mathers, he left the Golden Dawn along with some former members and formed a separate order.

With the death of Paul Foster Case his secretary Ann Davies became the head of B.O.T.A.. The order flourished and expanded to Europe and Australia.

Beliefs
B.O.T.A. believes that the Qabalah is the mystical root of both ancient Judaism and the original Christianity. People of all faiths are accepted if they are mystically inclined.

For members of the B.O.T.A., the means whereby higher consciousness, illumination and enlightenment may be gained include both theory and practice. These teachings and practical secrets constitute what the Builders of the Adytum refer to as Ageless Wisdom. It is called “Ageless” because they believe it is not susceptible to the mutations of time. Ageless Wisdom is not viewed by the B.O.T.A. as primarily a product of man’s thinking. It is “written by God upon the face of nature” and is always there for men and women of all epochs to read, if they can.

Regional organizations
B.O.T.A. has Study Groups and Pronaos healing ritual work in many cities throughout the world:
 Northeast US
 Midwest / Southeast US
 Southwest US / Rocky Mt.
 Northwest US
 Southern California / Arizona / Nevada
 South America & Mexico
 Australia and New Zealand
 Europe

Study groups
These groups are open to all and afford an opportunity to interact with those who share a common spiritual teaching and practice. The purposes for the Study Groups include (1) developing fraternal Love and Harmony, (2) developing higher consciousness, (3) incorporating the principles of Ageless Wisdom in everyday life, (4) learning to enjoy together the operation of the One Will (the will of God), and (5) providing an open door to the Mysteries to all who genuinely seek them.

Group ritual
Group Ritual Work has long been used in the Western mystery tradition as a dynamic means of bringing about spiritual and fraternal insights. Open only to B.O.T.A. members, this ritualistic work occurs after initiation into Pronaos which includes an oath of secrecy. Its aim is to impress symbolism more effectively upon the aspirants' psyches through dramatic enactment, bringing the static images of the B.O.T.A. tarot deck into motion.

See also
B.O.T.A. tarot deck
Magical organization

References

Sources
Hulse, David Allen. The Western Mysteries. Llewellyn Publications; 2nd edition, 2002.

External links

Magical organizations
Religious belief systems founded in the United States